Casey and Andy (stylised as Casey & Andy, or simply C&A) is a webcomic series written and illustrated by Andy Weir. Following the adventures of two mad scientists (fictionalized versions of Weir himself and his best friend Casey Grimm) and of their friends and acquaintances (such as writer Jenn Brozek), it was typically updated three times a week, on Mondays, Wednesdays, and Fridays throughout the early 2000s, primarily with a gag-a-comic format, including ongoing storylines and running gags.

The comic has a strong flavor of science and history fact, often from obscure sources, as well as featuring strong parallels between Weir's and Grimm's actual lives and the events in the comic. Some strips are inspired by then-current events, such as with the Opportunity mission to Mars, the 2003 invasion of Iraq and the 2004 United States presidential election. The strip was turned made into a roleplaying game titled GURPS Casey and Andy for the GURPS system by David Morgan-Mar in conjunction with Weir, its PDF sourcebook being published by Steve Jackson Games, inspiring a "Casey & Andy approach" to death in the MMORPG genre.

On 1 May 2006, Weir announced that the strip would come to an end on Strip 666, due to Weir's recent dread for creating each strip to standard and of the potential for a downturn in the quality of the humor, and also so he could devote his time to Cheshire Crossing, his new webcomic project. Casey and Andy concluded with its 666th strip on 25 August 2008. The character of Bob was later featured in Weir's 2017 novel Artemis.

On 31 December 2021, a Casey and Andy subreddit, created and overseen by David Morgan-Mar, Casey Grimm, and John Gillman, with Weir's approval, was created for the social news and discussion website Reddit, publishing an official crossover comic with the Tredlocity science fantasy webcomic Val and Isaac, starring the character of Space Dread, in January 2022, along with an authorised offline-accessible Mega archive of the webcomic.

Development
In October 2008, Weir revealed the "original idea [behind Casey and Andy to be] based on real life. Casey [Grimm] and I would often do stupid stuff, or have stupid conversations that I thought might be good comedy. That was the original inspiration. The characters quickly took on a life of their own from there, and the “based on real life" aspect of it quickly went away[…] That general strategy of making new characters willy-nilly benefited the strip a lot, I think. There were a few instances of characters I threw in for a gag or two that became excellent sources of plot and humor. For instance, Quantum Cop was originally slated to show up rarely if ever, and always in the context of giving Casey and Andy a ticket. The King of Sweden hanging out on the couch… I never would have expected that to be funny for more than one or two strips, but that well never ran dry." Weir additionally revealed a spin-off series, Anti-Stupid-Science Man, had been considered, but that he could "never figure out how to make it funny". At the 2016 Silicon Valley Comic-Con, Weir sat on the “Master of Webcomics" panel in response to his series, with Tapas App's 2016 promotion on Weir's webcomic start (prior to the launch of Principles of Uncertainty and Cheshire Crossing) additionally citing Bob the Angry Flower as a primary influence for Casey and Andy.

Synopsis
The title characters are 21st-century mad scientists dabbling in time and dimension travel, instantaneous cloning, and increasingly complex apocalyptic doomsday devices. Apart from that, they live in suburbia with their girlfriends, Mary and Satan. Casey and Andy share their little corner of the universe with an old school buddy – now dictator of Japan – who wants to kill them, a seemingly normal next-door neighbor who also wants to kill them, and a local cop who understands quantum physics better than Werner Heisenberg and would like to arrest them for breaking the laws of nature. Our not-quite-heroes’ lives are just a touch complex.

Characters
 Storylines

Most of the comic's events occur in this dimension, and the main characters live here. Due to the high number of characters in this dimension, they are further divided into three categories. The main characters are those most strips focus on, the secondary characters are recurring supportive characters, and single-use characters are characters that appeared only once or twice, or whose role were limited to a single story arc. In an interview with Leesa Hanagan of Sequential Tart on 7 January 2008, Weir cited Peanuts, Bloom County and Stephen Notley's Bob the Angry Flower as the inspiration behind Cheshire Crossing and the then-on-hiatus Casey and Andy.

Main characters

Casey Grimm

Casey T. Grimm is the archetype of the mad scientist bent on global domination, based on the man of the same name. One way or another, all of his inventions have something to do with that goal. Having grown up in Fremont as best friends with Andy, they ended up splitting the expenses of maintaining a home. He is totally loyal to Mary, proposing to her in the strip's last story arc. He seems to like and trust Andy, despite Andy's having inadvertently spoiled a number of Casey's evil schemes, but occasionally tries to murder him. His alter-ego is Dr. X, a supervillain whose attempts at evil often cause good instead, although he does easily become dictator of France (before becoming bored with the country and randomly accidentally having them randomly surrender themselves over to Germany).

Casey sports a pointy spike of yellow hair swept forward over his forehead, which only accentuates his large nose. He tinkers more than Andy but spends less time on his computer. Not having his own hovercraft, Casey prefers to improve the house's nuclear arsenal and early warning systems when not working on mad science projects, or burning the house down, a gag later referenced in Ryan Pagelow's Buni Comics.

Not one for mundane ambitions, Casey desires nothing less than to rule the world. He indulges in this pursuit as the black-masked "Dr. X," a secret identity he firmly believes is unknown even to his closest friends. This is despite clear evidence to the contrary, such as when Andy intentionally used the mask to clean the litter box, and delivered him a new mask (mistakenly one meant for Cobra Commander). One time Casey went so far as to clone himself so he and Dr. X could appear together on Casey & Andy's Snooty Discussion Hour. Fortunately (or unfortunately) for the rest of his universe, once Casey realized the clone would not share the fruits of world conquest, he quite sensibly shot the new Dr. X. Casey did get to indulge his passion for ruling (briefly) when Satan asked him to mind Hell while she fought the rebellious demon Azrael, later joining the League of Recurring Antagonists alongside him, and running for President of the United States.

Andy Weir
Andrew T. "Andy" Weir is a mad scientist, less interested in world domination than in creating mad inventions for their own sake, based on the writer of the same name. His research interests include astronomy, dark, magic, and hamsters. He dates Satan, absolutely hates Casey's girlfriend Mary, and as for Casey, their relationship is complicated, alternating between being best friends and worst enemies, finally fully embracing their friendship after Casey eventually has him move out. His secret alter-ego is Anti-Stupid-Science (ASS) Man. He is the only known male version of himself across the multiverse.

His family recognized his talents when he was young and took the precaution of leaving him at home when they went on vacations to Europe. While still at school, he performed his first Satanic summoning ritual and helped Casey build their first time machine, later naming the units of time travel power "Weirs" after himself. However, it was only as an adult that he and Satan hooked up after she got "stars in her eyes" for the (literally) Hell-bent boy, as foreseen thousands of years before his birth. Andy's best friend is Casey, although the two also compete at everything they do, which more than occasionally escalates to the use of deadly weapons and the usual consequences. Besides mad science, Andy spends time programming, tinkering with his hovercraft, and detonating hamsters. Barely more stable than Casey, he's mostly content to live a placid suburban life of building dimensional portals and dating Satan, including selling out Neo to the Agents. For fun, he likes arguing with evangelists about the logical inconsistencies in religious doctrine. He's sent more than one zealot gibbering to the Fremont Insane Asylum.

Andy's primary vices amount to greed and lust. Despite not needing any more money, he covets it enough to rob the Fremont National Bank on occasion. Sleeping with Satan is usually enough to satisfy his desire for sins of the flesh, but Andy also nurses an anachronistic crush on President Grover Cleveland's young wife, Frances, unaware that she is also Satan, born out of his time-stretched rivalry with Grover himself. In The Finale Arc, their feud is revealed to have been borne on Grover's end of the timeline from Andy travelling back in time to save Jenn after she was stranded in 1886, as well as a later incident in GURPS Casey and Andy, where Grover has access to his own time machine.

Mary MacTavish
Mary "Mac" MacTavish is Casey’s girlfriend and shares the house with him, Andy, and Satan. A grade ahead of Casey and Andy at school, she ran a good line loan-sharking her fellow students – including Andy. This established a long-standing mutual hatred between them. On the other hand, Mary gets along well with Satan, especially when rolling their eyes at their boyfriends' strange antics. Satan, however, is not much for "girl talk". Andy once used Mary as the subject of an experiment, which resulted in her hands acquiring long steel talons that she can extend and retract at will. She fights frighteningly well with them and keeps them sharp for emergencies, while taking care to ensure they never cut her hair, no matter how long it gets.

Mary also hates puns to the point of suffering physical pain when exposed to them. She takes this seriously enough to moonlight as a "Pun Police" officer, complete with uniform and guns. She has shot people more than once for transgressing in her presence. Lord Milligan still gloats that he got her to kill Casey once by giving the mad scientist an irresistible pun opportunity.

Her parallel universe (originating from Dungeons & Dragons) counterpart is the sword-wielding "Pun Paladin".

Satan
Satan is the fallen archangel and Queen of Darkness, also known as Lucifer "Luci" Morningstar, the Light-Bringer, "grounded" from Heaven by her father, God, for attempting to usurp him. She can assume any shape, and she has chosen this one for now. She is the celestial embodiment of evil and Andy's girlfriend, living in their Fremont house with him, Casey, and Mary. Despite her job and reputation, she is easy enough to get along with, and actually quite polite. Satan in her normal form has a forked tongue, a little tuft of hair right between her eyes, and horns inspired by the character Rook Bartley from Genesis Climber MOSPEADA and Robotech: The New Generation.

Despite being the ruler of Hell and the second most powerful being in the universe, Satan commutes to work much like any mortal – except that she jumps dimensions rather than taking the bus.

Being a diabolic immortal, Satan gets a lot of perks. Although she doesn't need to breathe, eat, drink, or sleep, she does so to fit in better with her mortal companions. She speaks all the languages of man but not alien tongues (since God only created life on Earth). She's is practically immune to all harm except holy water; turning insubstantial protects her from anything that causes physical damage. She can shapeshift into a dizzying array of demonic and mortal forms, produce flames anywhere on her body at will, and shoot jets of fire from her hands. She can possess people, provoke unnatural terror in any who dare contravene her wishes and summon numerous low-grade demons to perform her bidding – even if their loyalty is grudging at best. Still, Satan practices appropriate paranoia since some of her demons are always looking for ways to increase their own power at her expense, having all shoulder demons (in particular Andy's) report to her.

But apart from all that, and despite being evil incarnate, Satan can be a pleasant enough person when she wants to be. She gets along well with her housemates most of the time, which for four people living under one roof is about as good as it gets. And despite her nature, her father – God – is still fond of her and typically overprotective of his little girl. He gave her a few important tasks in the Creation, including finishing off the design for women: she gave them breasts so women would forevermore possess the power to move men to evil. For fun, she occasionally annually works as a mall Santa whenever "Santa" is accidentally misspelled as "Satan" in letters. Satan, of course, likes people to do evil things and quietly encourages such behavior. She tempts mortals to sign over their souls by offering them incredible temptations – or, as in Casey’s example, waiting until they’re thoroughly distracted by some experiment and asking them to “sign here." However, she can- not directly cause mortals to behave in any particular way and instead so must rely on persuasion and trickery. She can deliberately hide the truth, twist meanings of words, and fail to correct misconceptions, but she cannot actually tell a lie or break her word.

Frances Cleveland

In The Finale Arc, the 1886-era Frances Folsom (whom Andy had already had an anachronistic crush on in the modern day, and had previously taken an older version of to modern times) is revealed to be Satan herself in an earlier human form, planning to marry Grover, and assume absolute power over mankind (of which both Grover is aware of, and does not care), who creates Lord Milligan's father to destroy Casey and Andy, before marrying Grover and becoming the First Lady of the United States, Frances Cleveland.

Quantum Cop
A very intelligent policeman who can deduce even the strangest courses of events through pure logic, Quantum Cop is never tricked by any excuses. He has won so many Nobel Prizes that he hardly even notices when he receives another one. His intelligence seemingly lapses only when it comes to Jenn, although he later admits he noticed her illegal actions all along. He has two ancestors in 1886, known as the "Newtonian Cop" and the "Cosplay Cop".

Quantum Cop is Officer 3.14 in Fremont's police force. As an idealist, he strongly believes that law and order are needed to maintain a stable, prosperous society, describing "Quantum probabilities [as] a dicey matter (no pun intended) . . .". In his eyes, nobody is above the law; he once ticketed God, booking Him for various crimes against common sense. God protested but got written up anyway. A true genius, Quantum Cop possesses comprehensive knowledge of all science, particularly modern physics, even beating Satan at chess to regain his life after being shot by Quantum Crook. Despite this astounding intellect, he is not good at applied science, particularly inventing and building gadgets, or lying, a skill which his captain instructs him to learn.

Jenn Brozek
Jennifer "Jenn" Brozek lives next door to Casey and Andy on Wasatch Drive, therefore repeatedly suffering collateral damage from their failed experiments, as well as being rendered incapable of socializing with more "normal" perople due to always ending up recounting various horrific tales she's involuntarily witnessed in front of them, including having been sent back in time, into hell, and into multiple parallel realities. Based on the writer of the same name, Jenn is later revealed by Quantum Cop to have an abnormal probability curve which results in strange things frequently happening in her vicinity; thus her many adventures are not as a result of her living so close to Casey and Andy, but rather Casey & Andy live next door to her because strange things are destined to happen in her vicinity. She has a crush on Quantum Cop and his parallel duplicate Quantum Crook, and has made repeated attempts to be noticed by them, both remaining clueless about Jenn's amorous intentions. She is the future mother of the time traveller J.J.. During The Finale Arc, it is revealed that she is an international jewel thief (based on Shanex from Weir's novel Theft of Pride) in the present day, after having a successful career publishing her plagiarised Star Wars/The Lord of the Rings-mashup fan-fiction in 1886 on being stranded there: "Sith Lord of the Rings", under the bearded persona of "J. Brozek", and inadvertently creating the first fanboys.

Secondary characters

Cujo
Cujo is ostensibly Andy's cat, though he more resembles a concentrated ball of evil with claws. He seems to exist only to make Andy wonder why he owns a cat. He ate Casey and Andy after they shrunk themselves and later went on a Fremont-wide rampage after Andy enlarged him in a fit of typically short- sighted experimental passion inspired by The Fifty-Foot Woman, and is known for defecating on Andy's carpet.

Lord Milligan
Looking like a completely black shadow except for his eyes. Lord Milligan Jr. wants to take over the world, and is a very traditional villain, placing a high importance on building his secret hideout with lava pools, ventilation ducts that can be crawled through, a self-destruct system that goes off if he is slain and similar clichés. Lord Milligan's parents left the service of Satan, and settled, of all places, in Fremont, allowing the young demon to grow up with Casey and Andy. His father, Lord M̶i̶l̶l̶i̶g̶a̶n̶ "Smith" Sr., is the biological son of Satan, created by her 1886 self to destroy Casey and Andy (whom she did not know at the time), making Milligan Satan's grandson and the nephew of Don Cindy Weir. Although he tried befriending them, Casey and Andy tormented him as the only kid in class who was just as weird as they were. Among other things, this included firing him from a catapult in kindergarten. Deeply embittered as a result, Milligan grew into an evil mastermind, building himself a secret lair inside Mt. Fuji.

Then he put out a contract on Casey and Andy, hiring the dreaded Mime Assassin to eliminate them and letting him use Milligan's safe house in Milpitas, 10 miles southeast of Fremont, as a base of operations. After Quantum Cop foiled that plot, Milligan briefly joined forces with Quantum Crook. The demon instated himself as dictator of Japan after Quantum Crook conquered the country by taking advantage of its excessively polite culture. Unfortunately for the new partnership, Quantum Cop, Casey, Andy, Mary, Jenn, and Andina (one of Andy's analogs) managed to corner them. Quantum Crook then threatened to destroy everyone by killing Milligan, which would have triggered lair-scuttling charges linked to the cliché-loving demon's heartbeat. Once Andina had banished Quantum Crook back to his home dimension, the (relatively) good guys went home, leaving Milligan as ruler of Japan. Quantum Cop didn't arrest Milligan because the demon hadn't broken any laws, with the Japanese Emperor Akihito coming to sleep on his couch. Milligan's relationship with Casey and Andy gradually becomes more friendly as the series progresses, to the point he begrudgingly agrees to serve as their Dungeon Master in Dungeons & Dragons. Despite his diabolic background, Milligan's mortal-world upbringing has meant he has not developed any significant demonic powers, living by "The Way of the Villain".

In an alternate timeline, Milligan is Casey's best friend, although he immediately gives Jenn the information needed to restore the original timeline on learning of his rulership over Japan there.

The Planet Devourer
The Planet Devourer is a very cute little pink creature with fangs, that, through a mistake in its creation, considers Cujo its mother. It was created by Dr. X for the purpose of forcing the world to bow to him or be devoured. As per Dr. X's plans, it can consume any kind of matter and completely destroys whatever it consumes; however, it takes very small bites and would take thousands of years to do any noticeable damage to the planet. By the conclusion of the series, the Planet Devourer is left behind in the White House in 1886, with the nibble damage it causes to the structure eventuall requiring it to be gutted and rebuilt in 1948.

The Mime Assassin
The Mime Assassin is a notorious career criminal and entertainer who scares even Casey and Andy. He wears a French mime costume and white face- paint with dramatic black eyeliner. Being a mime, he communicates solely by sign language. When he kidnaps people, he sends blank ransom notes – a modus operandi that instantly connects him to the crime. As the world's greatest master of stealth, he has been hired twice by Lord Milligan to eliminate his enemies. Although the Mime is a cunning, silent, state-of-the-art killer, Quantum Cop captured him by locking him in an invisible box. Unfortunately for society, when the flow of evil into the world was interrupted during the battle for Hell between Satan and Azrael, the California governor declared evil a thing of the past and released the Mime Assassin from prison. He later allied with Quantum Crook to take over the world and was seemingly subsequently killed by Mary with her claws, only to later seen to be alive, as a member of the League of Recurring Antagonists. Marco Maez / Mime from Doomsday Clock is inspired by the character.

Nazi Whales
Whales in Casey and Andy's world aren't exactly what you’d call "gentle giants." Conservative to the point of the ridiculous, they rejected evolution's advances and returned to the sea to protest the evils of progress. They naturally gravitated to Nazism since their aggressive reactionary policies include hatred of all non-aquatic mammalian species. Nazi Whales wear swastika flipper-bands and take a keen interest in oppressing or eliminating humans whenever they get a chance, with one of them becoming a founding member of the League of Recurring Antagonists.

Don Cindy Weir
Andy and Satan's daughter, Don Cindy Weir is a girl scout who takes drastic methods to sell her cookies, including enrolling in the Girl Scout Mafia, and joining the League of Recurring Antagonists.

The Religious Zealot
Known by no other name, the stereotypical Religious Zealot spreads the word of Jesus on God's direct behalf, hoping to lead everyone to eternal salvation, including (paradoxically) Satan herself (accidentally making a "deal with the devil" more than once), earning ill-will from Andy, who is frustrated by the two eventually becoming friends despite their opposite backgrounds and of Zealot's lack of "zealousy", itself brought on by Casey's and Andy's intolerance for contradictions in religious doctrine teaching him a life-altering lesson on the evils of human nature, and sabotaging his relationships, as well as being fascinated by Satan's forked tongue. After finally defeating Satan (in 1886) and purging her of a degree of evil (leading to the "mellowed" Satan of the modern era), God allows the Zealot to remain in 1886, where he will no longer be considered an outcast.

In an alternate timeline, the Religious Zealot is shown to be in a relationship with Satan, whom he refers to as his "Mistress of Hell".

The Bug Fairy
The Bug Fairy is a troublesome 4"-tall winged female fairy with blue skin and a talent for misinformation, known to cause and thrive upon software bugs. Knowing all computer languages, she often shows up to "advise" programs dealing with particularly intractable coding problems, first seen as a member of the League of Recurring Antagonists before receiving numerous individual comic strips of focus, and serving Rob Petrone.

King Carl XVI Gustaf of Sweden

At one point, the King of Sweden, Carl XVI Gustaf, on route to give Quantum Cop a Nobel Prize, decided to hang around, and started living on the couch in Casey and Andy's house. He frequently demands that they bring him drinks (a request Andy complies with in exchange for being made a Duke of Sweden), briefly becoming a Land Pirate after being abducted by them and developing Stockholm syndrome, before returning to the couch, and being succeeded on his death in 2026 by his daughter, Victoria.

God
Satan's father, God bathes Andy with a vengeance, and likes to drive home this point with the aid of lightning. Once arrested and successfully ticketed by Quantum Cop.

The Zarb
The Zarb are bright green aliens from the planet Neptar, as well as the most-common found variety of alien on Earth. They are two feet tall and round, with a single eye on a stalk projecting another foot high. They have three fingers on each hand ("Gimme three!") and were known for loving punching human beings in the groin region of their bodies and mutilating cattle before being arrested as a species by Quantum Cop, before one of their members is subjected to a "Galactic Anal Survey" by Casey and Andy. The high-tech Zarb enjoy the advantages of faster-than-light travel, gravity manipulation, teleportation beams, and automatic translating gadgets, which tend to render positive statements negative ("Yes" as "No") and vice-versa. Their abduction and subsequent embarrassment at poking and prodding humans has allowed them to develop a cure for all human illness, which they then dismissed for preferring to continue "conquering" Earth and subjugating humanity so-as be punched in the groin at their leisure.

Grover Cleveland

The twenty-second and twenty-fourth President of the United States Grover Cleveland is a sworn enemy of Andy. They are engaged in a battle across time, and Grover Cleveland appears to be winning. He is married to Satan in 1886, in the guise of Frances Folsom, of which he is aware, but does not care. After serving as President untiil 1897, instituting sweeping tariff reforms, he later has numerous time travel adventures using J.J's abandoned portable time-travel device, a plot point later referenced in Eric Clements' Bohemian Nights.

Recurring characters

Death
Death is a character who sometimes appears to take Casey and/or Andy away to hell, usually when one of their many experiments in mad science goes wrong. In his role as your standard skeletal Grim Reaper, Death collects the souls of the recently departed. In some cases he hastens the departure with his trusty scythe. As his boss, Satan can order him to collect – or not collect – anyone in particular. Not having much in the way of brains, Death is rather easily tricked into thinking he has the right person when the intended victim indicates someone else, as Casey did to Andy. Death also has the bad habit of lurking around when Casey and Andy are about to buy it again, though this sort of omen rarely balks them.

Azrael
The demon Azrael holds a senior minionship in Hell, but harbors ambitions to take Satan's throne for himself. With the clairvoyant help of the Evil Cauldron of Fate, he succeeds once in Overthrow of Hell, but Casey and Andy help foil his plans. Satan subsequently executes him, sending him to another plane of existence. He is later revealed to have become a member of the League of Recurring Antagonists.

Demons
Hell is full of demons. These denizens generally have light-absorbing black bodies and glowing red eyes, though some, like Azrael, are basically humanoid. Most are hard-working minions of Satan, but some have designs on greater power (they are evil, after all). Demons may be encountered outside Hell, running some errand for Satan or perhaps up to some devious scheme of their own.

The Cauldron of Fate
The Cauldron of Fate is a sentient cauldron in service of Satan.

Chess-O-Mats
The Chess-O-Mats are a pair of chess-playing machines with a handicap. Casey and Andy have each built a Chess-O-Mat. Since chess talent represents the pinnacle of human intelligence, these sentient contraptions possess the smartest AI ever developed, incorporating neural net processors and sophisticated developmental-learning engines. Unfortunately, they don't have any arms, much fewer hands, making it impossible for either of them to physically play chess. Despite this, they are incredibly smart and could come in handy any time a plan of action requires dramatic chess strategy – which in a cinematic world is all the time.

J.J.
J.J. is Jenn's daughter from the year 2031; in Casey and Andy's time, she hasn't been born yet, She comes back in time to investigate a change to the timeline that threatens to prevent her birth. Discovering that Jenn got accidentally thrown back to 1986 by Casey and Andy, she guides her mother throughout multiple time-jumps to prevent reality from collapsing. until 2007. She wears sunglasses reminiscent of Quantum Cop's and can produce an easel from nowhere when she needs to explain things, just as her mother and Quantum Cop can. J.J. refuses to divulge who her father is, telling Jenn it would cause problems for future timelines. Genetic testing has shown that her father is either Quantum Cop or Quantum Crook, the latter of whom steals her portable time-travel device in The Finale Arc.

J.J.'s portable time-travel device is worn as a bracer on her forearm. This item can shift her and another person through time according to the currently available timelines. It requires power for each time jump. It can store enough for several jumps but cannot be recharged except by devices available in 2031 of J.J.’s original timeline.

Rob Petrone
Robert "Rob" Petrone is a fan of Casey and Andy from beyond the fourth wall, who attempts to insert himself into Casey's and Andy's social circle after stealing their Self-Insert-O-Mat.

Bob
Bob is a running joke in the comic, in reference to when Weir had submitted a manuscript of his book to a publisher, but it was sent back with the complaint that the book had only two characters, which the publisher did not consider enough. To retaliate, Weir pasted "Bob was there too" on the end of every 15th paragraph. Weir later featured the character in his 2017 novel Artemis.

Mabel
Mabel is a mild-mannered old lady who lives on Wasatch Drive, represents the street's homeowners’ association when it decides that action is needed to deal with Casey, Andy, and Jenn. Mostly she targets Jenn, with complaints about obnoxious garden furniture, due to having a modicum of common sense and fears for her life and sanity should she set foot next door.

St. Peter

St. Peter guards the gates of Heaven. That's pretty much it. He could be sent on some sort of mission by God, but otherwise, he'll only be encountered by people attempting to gain admission to Heaven. It's not too surprising that Casey and Andy don't see him much.

Wellhung the Hunkinite
Wellhung is the leader of the alien species known as the Hunkinites, from the planet Hunk. He resembles a fit, muscular human male bar for having blue skin and two thin antennae on his head. As members of a highly advanced race, male Hunkinites see their purpose as being to serve the needs of the females of the species, who have a tendency to leave them due to a dislike of their sensitivity and fidelity. They also didn't go in for the male Hunkinites’ love of reciting poetry and giving foot massages. When questing for a new Hunkinite queen, Wellhung considers Jenn to be a perfect choice. Jenn accepts the role as Queen of the Hunkinites, only to be teleported away by a well-meaning Casey and Andy, and later accidentally telling Wellhung to get lost with her eyes closed, thinking he was Casey or Andy banging on her door again.

Farmer Hayes
Farmer Hayes is the owner of "Hayes Manure", a manure company whose signature giant pile Casey and Andy infrequently crash into when undergoing falling experiments, and who often has to prevent members of the Zarb from mutilating his cows.

Dante

Dante, author of The Divine Comedy, is an "old friend" of Satan's, often to be found dressed in a loud Hawaiian shirt and Panama hat while trying to write a sequel to please his publisher. He enjoys embarrassing Satan by regaling her more recent acquaintances with old stories about her.

The Punk-Ass Goths
A duo of "punk-ass" goth teenagers who keep attempting to summon Satan, only to neglect following minor parts of the instructions to do so.

The Organization of Land Pirates
The Organization of Land Pirates are an organisation of pirates who work on the land instead of the sea.

Parallel dimension characters
Using either technology or magic, characters of the prime dimension are able to cross over to parallel dimensions. These dimensions contain doppelgänger of the inhabitants of the prime dimension, but with minor changes - different genders, different good/evil orientations, and so on.

Dimension of Hackneyed Opposites
A dimension of opposites that Andy visited to test his parallel-dimension-travel-o-mat.

Andi Weir
Andi Weir is Andy's analog from Quantum Crook's dimension. She was previously sexually promiscuous until she "found the Lord" – explained as not meaning becoming religious, but rather embarking in a monogamous relationship with her dimension's God. Previously she had been romantically involved with her dimension’s Casey Grimm, a revelation which caused a great deal of consternation to Andy Weir, though his dimension's Casey found the entire concept hilarious enough to make a crass joke about it. In Jenn in Time, Andi is in a relationship with Andy's dimension's Casey in an alternate timeline created by the actions of Jenn Brozek, where-in Mary died as a teenager.

God
Andi's boyfriend in this universe, God eems scary, but deep down, he's an old softie.

Quantum Crook
An interdimensional analog of Quantum Cop, Quantum Crook shares many traits with his counterpart, but while Quantum Cop seeks to uphold the law, Quantum Crook flouts it. In his opinion, the lack of an absolute morality means that law can never be anything but artificial, making a dictatorship (with him in charge, of course) as potentially beneficial to mankind as democracy. Not surprisingly, he attempted to take over Casey and Andy's world, just because he could, after Andy carelessly left a dimensional portal open. Even with Lord Milligan as an accomplice, Quantum Crook still lost out to Quantum Cop. The officer sent Casey and Andy to another dimension to fetch the cleric Andina, who could banish Quantum Cop back to his own plane. Before she did, though, Quantum Cop refuted Quantum Crook's view on the law by pointing out that law isn't about good and evil but about protecting people. At that point, getting punted home was just adding insult to injury. Quantum Crook bides his time, though, knowing that sooner or later Casey and Andy will heedlessly open another portal, allowing him to resume his plans, founding the League of Recurring Antagonists, before stealing J.J.'s portable time-travel device, randomly sent on a one-way-trip back in time to 1886 by Jenn (with herself), before quickly rising to become the chief-of-staff of U.S. President Grover Cleveland, while being open about his status as a being "both from the future AND from a parallel dimension[…] look[ing] forward to "conquering the earth".", arranging many "strange and scandalous things" for the President, including his marriage to Frances Folsom, which he means to prevent on learning of her identity, wishing to instead "control the President myself through subtle means as his advisor". After being sent back to his own dimension by Quantum Cop, Quantum Crook conquers his dimension's Confederate-run 1886 along with Jann, his wife, and his dimension's Jenn.

Doctor Y
Doctor X's super-hero doppelgänger, Doctor Y is the saviour of the world. After following Quantum Crook through a portal to the main reality, he is seemingly vaporised by Quantum Crook with Andy's "Casey Vaporizo-Annilhilat-O-MAT".

Mary MacTavish
Mary MacTavish is a busy shuttle commander in space.

Milligan
Milligan is a famous Japanese rock star.

The Mime Plumber
The Mime Plumber is of no consequence to anyone.

Jann
Jann is Quantum Crook's wife, who has green hair and wears an eyepatch.

Fantasy Dimension
A dimension which follows the rules of Dungeons & Dragons, first visited at Quantum Cop's request in the Quantum Crook storyline, and later hosting the Great Orb of Power! story arc.

Andina
A cleric of Zogor, Andina is another interdimensional analog of Andy and is also dating a divinity: her patron god, Zogor. Her magical healing powers include raising the dead and banishing extraplanar creatures to their home dimension, including Quantum Crook and Rob Petrone.

Zogor
One of the main deities ruling over this dimension, Zogor is dating Andina, a cleric of theirs.

Kasor
The doppelgänger of Casey, Kasor is a mage, and advisor to the Queen, who secretly plots to take over the realm, before becoming the new Evil Grand Vizier after being killed and resurrected.

Queen Jena
The doppelgänger of Jenn, Queen Jena is the Queen of Fremontia.

Evil Grand Vizier Milligawain
The doppelgänger of Lord Milligan, and Evil Grand Vizier of Fremontia. As with all Grand Viziers, Milligawain tries to take over the throne; indeed this is a requirement for the job. Following the Great Orb of Power! story arc, he assumed a new role in the government of Fremontia, after proposing to and then marrying Queen Jena.

Quantum Ninja
The doppelgänger of Quantum Cop and personal assassin of the Queen, the Quantum Ninja has a π symbol stamped on her forehead.

Stygian Zealot
The Stygian Zealot is a member of an underground faction of Stygians, who are powerful in both magic and military, who is sent to kill the Queen.

Mari
The doppelgänger of Mary MacTavish, Mari is a ruthless mercenary who works for Evil Grand Vizier Milligawain. She despises puns just as the prime dimension's Mary does.

Cujo
Cujo is Queen Jena's pet snake.

Stan
Chief Paper-pusher of the Underwriterworld. Stan is Satan's equivalent in this dimension. He has many forms.

King Bloid
The King of the Zarb, King Bloid is the counterpart of the crotch-punching alien from Neptar. He likes cows in an impure way.

Accounting Irregularity Fairy
The Bug Fairy's counterpart, the Accounting Irregularity Fairy is the head mage of the Underwriterworld.

The Devourer of Worlds
Known by the same name, this reality's Devourer of Worlds is the High Wizard of the Zarb.

Evil Grand Vizier Snerd
The Evil Grand Vizier of the Zarb, Snerd pledges himself to Kasor before immediately rescinding his loyalty on losing his power.

The Hunkinites
Like in the prime dimension, the Hunkinites are blue hunky aliens whose sole purpose in life is still to please women. They still have Jena as their queen.

The Great Sorcerer
Thousands of years ago, the Great Sorcerer put an end to a war between the kingdoms by creating Mount Magus. He is an unseen character in the series.

Themes and story arcs
The Casey and Andy webcomic primarily features one-strip gags. Since the two main characters in the webcomic are evil scientists, the two main themes of the gags are science (current scientific events, obscure scientific facts, common mistakes) and evil (world domination ploys, bank robberies, evil inventions). Other common themes for the strip include "Diabolical Riddle Days", "cheesecakes", role-playing games and Christianity; Weir has noted all jokes involving Christianity as having been intended to be done in a completely respectful and non-offensive fashion.

The author does occasionally go into story arcs that span multiple strips. They are, in chronological order:

 The Story Arc – Also known as The Mime Assassin; in which titular Mime Assassin is hired by Lord Milligan to kill Andy. Strips 90 to 98.

 Overthrow of Hell – Also known as Azrael’s Hell Coup!; in which Azrael tries to overthrow Satan and take over Hell. Strips 138 to 152.

 Quantum Crook! – In which the Quantum Crook comes to the primary dimension. Strips 197 to 230.

 Jenn in Time – Also known as Back to the Jenn or simply Jenn; in which Jenn is accidentally sent back to the 1980s. Strips 311, 320 to 362.

 Great Orb of Power! – Also known as GOOP!, The Fantasy Arc and The Mountain of Mages; In which Jenn is asked to replace Queen Jena. Strips 446 to 482.

 Rob Petrone – Also known as The Petroniad and Casey and Andy and Rob; In which Rob steals Andy's life. (Guest strip arc by Petrone, done while Weir moved to Boston.) Strips 492 to 501.

 The Land Pirates – In which the Organization of Land Pirates kidnap the King of Sweden. Strips 598 to 612.

 The Finale Arc – Quantum Crook steals J.J.'s time machine, but when Jenn jumps him, they're both transported back in time to 1886. The gang follows them to rescue Jenn. Strips 621 to 666.

Inventions
Being mad scientists, Casey and Andy are often busy creating strange inventions. These inventions sometimes work, and sometimes fail because the inventors overlooked some blindingly obvious detail. The inventions can sometimes backfire on their creators, killing them in a number of ways. They are always inexplicitly resurrected without any knowledge of their demises.

 Clone-O-Mat: A cloning machine, used by Casey to clone another version of himself to serve as Doctor X, and by Satan to see what she looks like.
 Scan-O-Mat: A present-scanning machine. A testament to how much Casey and Andy trust each other.
 Phobia Swap-O-Mat: A device to transfer the phobia of one person onto another.
 Casey Vaporizo-Annihilatomat: Yet another testament of the love between Casey and Andy.
 Mass-Convert-O-Mat: Converts mass, though we're not quite sure into what. At least that's what it would do if it worked. Instead, it explodes. Which, come to think of it, could very well be part of the mass-conversion process.
 Mind-Read-O-Mat: A not-so-subtle tool for invading someone's privacy.
 L33T-O-Mat: Translates from and to l33t. Does not seem entirely unbiased.
 SS Boat-O-Mat: An ordinary boat.
 End-Of-The-World-O-Mat: A doomsday device.
 Nuke-O-Mat: A nuclear bomb.
 Dumb-Ass-O-Mat: An intelligence dampener.
 Landmark-Destruct-O-Mat: A device that can destroy monuments on distant foreign soil.
 Razer-Sharp-Propeller-O-Mat: A razor-sharp propeller, which Andy deduces will fulfill a prophecy from gypsy fortune teller Madame Greeb which will lead to his Casey's decapitation, but nonetheless allows him to continue his testing of it.
 Compute-O-Matic: A World War II-era computer.
 Mind-Scan-O-Mat: A device that can scan a brain. In theory, one could then take the scanned intelligence and place it in a virtual body in a virtual world, to create a replica of our world.
 Brain-Swap-O-Mat: A device that can swap brains with another person, used on Mary & Satan, and Casey & Cujo, before being broken, Andy requesting that Casey (in Cujo's body) fix it.
 Hair-Lengthen-And-Spike-O-Mat: Responsible for Casey's unique hair-style.
 Art-O-Mat: A painting that paints itself.
 Chair-O-Mat: A chair with all the comforts of the modern world built in.
 Dog-O-Mat: An android dog that barks in binary.
 Vent-O-Mat: A ventilation system for an outhouse.
 Self-Insert-O-Mat: A device for inserting yourself into another person's social life with their noticing your previous absence.
 Safe-O-Mat: A safe with all possible security checks, including palm scan, retinal scan, voice recognition, blood sample analyzer, stool sample analyzer, and a note from your mother reader.
 The Splurch: An aptly-named device made by Andy. Denounced by Casey for not being a traditional "o-mat" invention, before being used on him by Andy, "spurch"-ing him with a spear.
 Existential-Conflict-O-Mat: A device allowing one to explore their own subconcious, and talk with their past selves.
 Memory-Erase-O-Mat: A device created by Casey and Andy to erase their memories of a great movie so they could watch it again for the "first time", only to learn from Mary that they had been "watching that same movie over and over for six straight weeks", and promptly erase the memory of her telling them so that they can "stop feeling stupid".
 Cannonball-To-The-Head-O-Mat: A cannon built by Casey, who means to blow Andy's head off on his request, only to disappointingly learn that it is to test Andy's invulnerability formula.
 Time-Trail-Track-O-Mat and Recall-O-Mat: Respectively a device allowing Casey and Andy to follow a specific person backwards or forwards through time, and a device to allow one to get back (in particular Jenn, built on J.J.'s request in The Finale Arc).
 Arm-O-Mat: A sentient "robotic monstrosity" of a cybernetic replacement arm created to replace Andy's missing arm at the conclusion of The Finale Arc.
 Jurrrz-O-Mat: A device that returns time travellers to their original time period, used to return J.J. to her time at the conclusion of The Finale Arc.

Merchandise

Clothing
From October 2004 onward, Weir selling a limited range of white and grey t-shirts, posters and mugs with designs based on the Casey and Andy series imprinted upon them from his website, having previously sold the clothing, alongside original artwork, posters and lapel pins. In both cases, every shirt made available was sold before the deadline set by Weir.

Role-playing game
On 22 April 2016, in conjunction with David Morgan-Mar, Weir designed and released a role-playing game for the GURPS system based on Casey and Andy, written by Morgan-Mar, and published by Steve Jackson Games. The game, titled GURPs Casey and Andy, follows the titular Andy as he brings Frances Cleveland (a past version of his girlfriend Satan to the present, leading to Grover Cleveland following them to reclaim his position as President of the United States.

Animation
Weir confirmed that a Flash animation based on Casey and Andy was in development for after the release of Strip No. 413 of Casey and Andy No. 2 via his personal website, releasing it on 24 November 2004. The short follows the minor Casey and Andy character of the Planet Devourer as they go about their day. On 9 April 2006, Weir released a theme song based on Casey and Andy to his website, sung by Corey Vidal and the a cappella group Moosebutter, which was subsequently animated on 12 May 2008.

Reception
In December 2006, Lore Sjoberg of Wired praised the series for "finally address[ing] the still-important affliction of Stand-Up Smugness" with its protagonists, described as those who "assume that anything you don't understand must be stupid [and] repeat the rhetorical questions of stand-up comedians because you think your ignorance makes you look intelligent", in particular citing the "Comedian Night School" arc (from Strip #576).

In December 2008, Morgan Wick negatively described the art style of Casey and Andy, in particular its "Casey and Andy Eyes", as nonetheless having been highly influential across the webcomic genre of the early 2000s, in particular The Wotch, El Goonish Shive, and later issues of the early-started Sluggy Freelance, saying:

"This condition, afflicting many a webcomic but especially those drawn by marginal artists or those overly inspired by anime, has as its major symptom extremely large eyes, often taking up more than half the face, with outlines that stop in the inside. Also accompanying it is rather cartoonish-looking faces, with features formed very simply. No cure is known aside from a general improvement in art skills, either on the part of the artist or, in more extreme cases, a replacement of the artist with someone more skilled."

David Morgan-Mar of Irregular Webcomic! (with which Casey and Andy had a brief crossover) meanwhile described the quality of the series as being on par with, if not superior to, Calvin and Hobbes, stating that not since that series "have I been this excited about an ongoing series", additionally praising Weir for "that very rare thing in the webcomics world — a completed webcomic. Andy Weir actually wrapped up his storyline and wrote a conclusion to the comic, after 666 strips." after Casey and Andy had concluded.

RP Kitty of RPG.net has described the series as "rather hilarious in a completely bizarre way" and "a fun romp of an adventure presented in comic strip form" Speaking with regards GURPS Casey and Andy, Kitty describes the role-playing game as "[a] faithful and well-done adaptation of the Casey & Andy webcomic. Fans of the strip will find much to like here, as will any gamer that enjoys settings, characters, and adventures with a bizarre sense of humor."

Peter C. Hayward of The Chainsaw Blokes described Casey and Andy as an "[a]bsolutely fun read", calling the series "by far one of the best comic strips I’ve ever read", citing his love for Weir's method of characterisation of the main characters, finding "the rest of the characters [to be] just as likeable too", describing the characters of Casey and Mary as "the most lovable couple ever". Regarding the series' artwork, Reviews described it as "incredible", saying "[t]here's so much attention to detail that it’s mind-blowing. I love the expressions people give in the comic whenever _ does something freaky. Their drawn faces and reactions are just priceless. Even [the Mime Assassin]’s expressions are entertaining. While he doesn't talk throughout the series, Andy found a way to let his mood and thoughts let the readers know what he's saying, and this method is brilliant. Also, it's nice to spot some cameos and easter eggs of classic movies in each comic strip".

Graham L. Wilson of icculus similarly lauded Casey and Andy as "one of the best web comics out there", in particular praising the recurring character of the Bug Fairy as "a poignant representation of the feeling that we software developers get that something unseen is wreaking our code", before presenting a homage GIF of the character for his own then-ongoing series Symel, a free content Internet cartoon project first created on 1 January 2006.

Rebecca Salek of Sequential Tart praised Casey and Andy as "geeky fun, [worth] a chance [to read]!", comparatively comparing its protagonists to Riff from Sluggy Freelance, and in particular praising Weir's characterisation of Satan as a "real softie", while WebSnark referred to it as "the future of geek comics [and] a journeyman strip", praising Weir's improving artistic style and the character development of the characters of Satan and Quantum Cop throughout the series.

Reviewing If I Were An Evil Overlord by Martin H. Greenberg and Russell Davis for the MIT Science Fiction Society of the Massachusetts Institute of Technology, Jake Beal favoured the novel in comparison to Casey and Andy as "an evergreen source of geek meta-humor", in particular the events of the webcomic's "Quantum Crook!" story arc.

Sergei and Morag Lewis of Toothy Cat comparatively compared the series to fellow webcomic College Roomies from Hell, described as "another 'me and my mates' comic", with both being "[n]otable for some really quite insane plots and a lack of characters", in addition to "[l]ong stretches of random gags, interspersed with long plots which require accurate quantum physics to navigate provides an interesting tempo", further praising the series' "occasional 'solve this riddle' strips, which would be better if the riddles used were less well known", but nonetheless as "[s]till a nice touch.".

Discussing the role of Death as a concept in the narratives of massively multiplayer online role-playing games, such as Final Fantasy XIV, Eliot Lefebvre of Engadget described the third major approach to the concept as "the Casey & Andy approach, which involves treating the whole thing as the most natural arrangement in the world. You die and come back from death over and over.".

While criticising the art style of the series as "look[ing] like it was drawn in MS Paint", Larsson of Trevliga Scenarion described the series as "prov[ing] the old thesis that a great cartoon can't do without a good script, while a simple cartoon will do as long as the script is great", concluding the series to be a "wonderfully funny and intelligent" read worth re-reading multiple times.

I. Hank of Ricochet praised the series as "a webcomic about mad science" which would "[o]ccasionally [b]reak into a story with some actual continuity", criticising the series' "character development [as] never Andy Weir’s strong point" but complimenting "[w]hat he does really, really well [a]s gadgets".

See also

 Andy Weir
 Cheshire Crossing

References

External links
 Galactanet: Andrew Taylor Weir – The Real Casey and Andy
 Index
 
 

2000s webcomics
2001 webcomic debuts
American comedy webcomics
Fictional scientists in comics